The Iskitim constituency (No.137) is a Russian legislative constituency in Novosibirsk Oblast. Until 2007, the constituency covered suburban and rural territories around Novosibirsk in eastern Novosibirsk Oblast. However, in 2015 the constituency was heavily gerrymandered: it currently takes parts of Novosibirsk itself and stretches alongside oblast's southern border as far as Bagan in the west.

Members elected

Election results

1993

|-
! colspan=2 style="background-color:#E9E9E9;text-align:left;vertical-align:top;" |Candidate
! style="background-color:#E9E9E9;text-align:left;vertical-align:top;" |Party
! style="background-color:#E9E9E9;text-align:right;" |Votes
! style="background-color:#E9E9E9;text-align:right;" |%
|-
|style="background-color:#0085BE"|
|align=left|Ivan Starikov
|align=left|Choice of Russia
|
|25.31%
|-
|style="background-color:"|
|align=left|Vladimir Karpov
|align=left|Independent
| -
|13.30%
|-
| colspan="5" style="background-color:#E9E9E9;"|
|- style="font-weight:bold"
| colspan="3" style="text-align:left;" | Total
| 
| 100%
|-
| colspan="5" style="background-color:#E9E9E9;"|
|- style="font-weight:bold"
| colspan="4" |Source:
|
|}

1995

|-
! colspan=2 style="background-color:#E9E9E9;text-align:left;vertical-align:top;" |Candidate
! style="background-color:#E9E9E9;text-align:left;vertical-align:top;" |Party
! style="background-color:#E9E9E9;text-align:right;" |Votes
! style="background-color:#E9E9E9;text-align:right;" |%
|-
|style="background-color:"|
|align=left|Yevgeny Loginov
|align=left|Liberal Democratic Party
|
|24.39%
|-
|style="background-color:"|
|align=left|Leonid Bochkarev
|align=left|Communist Party
|
|16.67%
|-
|style="background-color:"|
|align=left|Ivan Starikov
|align=left|Independent
|
|14.80%
|-
|style="background-color:"|
|align=left|Aleksey Manannikov
|align=left|Independent
|
|13.88%
|-
|style="background-color:"|
|align=left|Georgy Ivashchenko
|align=left|Independent
|
|5.05%
|-
|style="background-color:#3A46CE"|
|align=left|Nikolay Krasnikov
|align=left|Democratic Choice of Russia – United Democrats
|
|4.00%
|-
|style="background-color:"|
|align=left|Sergey Sverchkov
|align=left|Independent
|
|2.79%
|-
|style="background-color:"|
|align=left|Yelena Malygina
|align=left|Yabloko
|
|2.54%
|-
|style="background-color:"|
|align=left|Leonid Goldyrev
|align=left|Agrarian Party
|
|1.72%
|-
|style="background-color:"|
|align=left|Aleksandr Terentyev
|align=left|Independent
|
|1.35%
|-
|style="background-color:#1C1A0D"|
|align=left|Aleksey Pavlenko
|align=left|Forward, Russia!
|
|1.21%
|-
|style="background-color:#2C299A"|
|align=left|Yury Yefimtsev
|align=left|Congress of Russian Communities
|
|1.15%
|-
|style="background-color:"|
|align=left|Vladimir Getmanov
|align=left|Independent
|
|0.86%
|-
|style="background-color:"|
|align=left|Oleg Chashkov
|align=left|Independent
|
|0.86%
|-
|style="background-color:#DD137B"|
|align=left|Vladimir Anufriyenko
|align=left|Social Democrats
|
|0.61%
|-
|style="background-color:#000000"|
|colspan=2 |against all
|
|6.18%
|-
| colspan="5" style="background-color:#E9E9E9;"|
|- style="font-weight:bold"
| colspan="3" style="text-align:left;" | Total
| 
| 100%
|-
| colspan="5" style="background-color:#E9E9E9;"|
|- style="font-weight:bold"
| colspan="4" |Source:
|
|}

1999

|-
! colspan=2 style="background-color:#E9E9E9;text-align:left;vertical-align:top;" |Candidate
! style="background-color:#E9E9E9;text-align:left;vertical-align:top;" |Party
! style="background-color:#E9E9E9;text-align:right;" |Votes
! style="background-color:#E9E9E9;text-align:right;" |%
|-
|style="background-color:"|
|align=left|Lyubov Shvets
|align=left|Communist Party
|
|28.75%
|-
|style="background-color:"|
|align=left|Sergey Kibirev
|align=left|Independent
|
|10.07%
|-
|style="background-color:"|
|align=left|Liana Pepelyayeva
|align=left|Independent
|
|9.55%
|-
|style="background-color:"|
|align=left|Konstantin Aseyev
|align=left|Independent
|
|8.25%
|-
|style="background-color:"|
|align=left|Oleg Gonzharov
|align=left|Our Home – Russia
|
|7.05%
|-
|style="background:#1042A5"| 
|align=left|Aleksandr Drugov
|align=left|Union of Right Forces
|
|4.60%
|-
|style="background-color:#3B9EDF"|
|align=left|Anatoly Chechin
|align=left|Fatherland – All Russia
|
|3.65%
|-
|style="background-color:"|
|align=left|Sergey Moskalev
|align=left|Independent
|
|3.37%
|-
|style="background-color:"|
|align=left|Vladimir Sablin
|align=left|Independent
|
|3.24%
|-
|style="background-color:"|
|align=left|Nadezhda Glukhova
|align=left|Independent
|
|2.69%
|-
|style="background-color:"|
|align=left|Vladimir Fofanov
|align=left|Independent
|
|1.33%
|-
|style="background-color:#FF4400"|
|align=left|Andrey Tikhomirov
|align=left|Andrey Nikolayev and Svyatoslav Fyodorov Bloc
|
|1.01%
|-
|style="background-color:#084284"|
|align=left|Anatoly Shabanov
|align=left|Spiritual Heritage
|
|0.91%
|-
|style="background-color:"|
|align=left|Oleg Chashkov
|align=left|Independent
|
|0.46%
|-
|style="background-color:#000000"|
|colspan=2 |against all
|
|13.14%
|-
| colspan="5" style="background-color:#E9E9E9;"|
|- style="font-weight:bold"
| colspan="3" style="text-align:left;" | Total
| 
| 100%
|-
| colspan="5" style="background-color:#E9E9E9;"|
|- style="font-weight:bold"
| colspan="4" |Source:
|
|}

2003

|-
! colspan=2 style="background-color:#E9E9E9;text-align:left;vertical-align:top;" |Candidate
! style="background-color:#E9E9E9;text-align:left;vertical-align:top;" |Party
! style="background-color:#E9E9E9;text-align:right;" |Votes
! style="background-color:#E9E9E9;text-align:right;" |%
|-
|style="background-color:"|
|align=left|Lyubov Shvets (incumbent)
|align=left|Communist Party
|
|24.78%
|-
|style="background-color:"|
|align=left|Andrey Shimkiv
|align=left|Independent
|
|23.48%
|-
|style="background-color:"|
|align=left|Yevgeny Loginov
|align=left|Liberal Democratic Party
|
|12.41%
|-
|style="background-color:#00A1FF"|
|align=left|Nikolay Krasnikov
|align=left|Party of Russia's Rebirth-Russian Party of Life
|
|11.43%
|-
|style="background-color:"|
|align=left|Tatyana Novaya
|align=left|Independent
|
|4.52%
|-
|style="background-color:"|
|align=left|Aleksandr Rudnitsky
|align=left|Yabloko
|
|2.87%
|-
|style="background:#1042A5"| 
|align=left|Yegor Ternovykh
|align=left|Union of Right Forces
|
|2.43%
|-
|style="background-color:#164C8C"|
|align=left|Sergey Siganov
|align=left|United Russian Party Rus'
|
|0.55%
|-
|style="background-color:#000000"|
|colspan=2 |against all
|
|14.49%
|-
| colspan="5" style="background-color:#E9E9E9;"|
|- style="font-weight:bold"
| colspan="3" style="text-align:left;" | Total
| 
| 100%
|-
| colspan="5" style="background-color:#E9E9E9;"|
|- style="font-weight:bold"
| colspan="4" |Source:
|
|}

2016

|-
! colspan=2 style="background-color:#E9E9E9;text-align:left;vertical-align:top;" |Candidate
! style="background-color:#E9E9E9;text-align:left;vertical-align:top;" |Party
! style="background-color:#E9E9E9;text-align:right;" |Votes
! style="background-color:#E9E9E9;text-align:right;" |%
|-
|style="background-color: " |
|align=left|Aleksandr Karelin
|align=left|United Russia
|
|44.58%
|-
|style="background-color:"|
|align=left|Aleksandr Abalakov
|align=left|Communist Party
|
|16.36%
|-
|style="background-color:"|
|align=left|Oleg Suvorov
|align=left|Liberal Democratic Party
|
|12.53%
|-
|style="background-color:"|
|align=left|Danil Ivanov
|align=left|A Just Russia
|
|8.40%
|-
|style="background:"| 
|align=left|Lyudmila Loskutova
|align=left|Communists of Russia
|
|4.23%
|-
|style="background:"| 
|align=left|Yegor Savin
|align=left|People's Freedom Party
|
|3.05%
|-
|style="background-color:"|
|align=left|Mikhail Khazin
|align=left|Rodina
|
|2.81%
|-
|style="background-color:"|
|align=left|Igor Yazykovsky
|align=left|The Greens
|
|1.31%
|-
|style="background:"| 
|align=left|Anatoly Madin
|align=left|Civic Platform
|
|0.78%
|-
|style="background:#00A650"| 
|align=left|Ivan Grichukov
|align=left|Civilian Power
|
|0.55%
|-
| colspan="5" style="background-color:#E9E9E9;"|
|- style="font-weight:bold"
| colspan="3" style="text-align:left;" | Total
| 
| 100%
|-
| colspan="5" style="background-color:#E9E9E9;"|
|- style="font-weight:bold"
| colspan="4" |Source:
|
|}

2021

|-
! colspan=2 style="background-color:#E9E9E9;text-align:left;vertical-align:top;" |Candidate
! style="background-color:#E9E9E9;text-align:left;vertical-align:top;" |Party
! style="background-color:#E9E9E9;text-align:right;" |Votes
! style="background-color:#E9E9E9;text-align:right;" |%
|-
|style="background-color:"|
|align=left|Aleksandr Aksyonenko
|align=left|A Just Russia — For Truth
|
|29.57%
|-
|style="background-color:"|
|align=left|Vitaly Novoselov
|align=left|Communist Party
|
|24.79%
|-
|style="background-color: " |
|align=left|Dmitry Starostenko
|align=left|United Russia
|
|13.66%
|-
|style="background-color: " |
|align=left|Andrey Teryayev
|align=left|New People
|
|7.90%
|-
|style="background-color:"|
|align=left|Yevgeny Lebedev
|align=left|Liberal Democratic Party
|
|5.66%
|-
|style="background-color:"|
|align=left|Natalya Pinus
|align=left|Rodina
|
|5.31%
|-
|style="background-color: "|
|align=left|Aleksandr Averkin
|align=left|Party of Pensioners
|
|5.23%
|-
|style="background: "| 
|align=left|Yelena Pivovarova
|align=left|Yabloko
|
|2.14%
|-
|style="background:"| 
|align=left|Aleksandr Plyushkin
|align=left|Civic Platform
|
|0.97%
|-
|style="background:"| 
|align=left|Yevgeny Tsybizov
|align=left|Party of Growth
|
|0.64%
|-
| colspan="5" style="background-color:#E9E9E9;"|
|- style="font-weight:bold"
| colspan="3" style="text-align:left;" | Total
| 
| 100%
|-
| colspan="5" style="background-color:#E9E9E9;"|
|- style="font-weight:bold"
| colspan="4" |Source:
|
|}

Notes

References

Russian legislative constituencies
Politics of Novosibirsk Oblast